Cristóbal Colón, de oficio... descubridor ("Christopher Columbus, by profession...discoverer")  is a Spanish comedy film, released on 8 September 1982. It is a comic interpretation of the preparations of  Columbus before making the discovery of the Americas.

Plot 
The film narrates, in comedic tone, the adventures of Christopher Columbus (Andrés Pajares) to convince Queen Isabella (Fiorella Faltoyano) to finance his journey to the West to find East Indies. With constant references to the political and social reality of the moment when the movie was filmed and comic anachronisms such as King Boabdil in charge of a casino. The film ends when Columbus and his crew  reach America which they all celebrate singing and dancing.

Reception 
In spite of its very bad critics it attracted a million and a half spectators to the cinema, and spawned similar pseudohistorical films such as Juana la loca... de vez en cuando or El Cid Cabreador.

References 

1982 films
Spanish comedy films
Films directed by Mariano Ozores
Fiction set in 1492
Age of Discovery films
Cultural depictions of Christopher Columbus
Films shot in Almería
1980s Spanish films